Tironui railway station was a station on the North Island Main Trunk in New Zealand, south of Auckland between Takanini railway station and Papakura railway station. Electric light was added in 1933. According to Scoble, it was opened on 10 May 1926 and closed on 13 August 1983.

The opening of the station added 2 minutes to the schedules of Auckland-Papakura trains. Puhinui, Homai and Te Mahia all opened at about the same time as Tironui, to cater for the expansion of Auckland's southern suburbs.

The railway through Tironui was opened on 20 May 1875, as part of the Auckland and Mercer Railway, built by Brogden & Co, who extended it from Penrose. Duplication of the tracks between Papatoetoe and Papakura, through Tironui, started in 1929 as an employment relief scheme and was completed on 29 March 1931. It was electrified in 2015.

In 2015 Auckland Transport agreed to investigation of a potential station site at Tironui, which could be opened if growth requires it. Other  potential new rail stations looked at were Paerata, Drury and Drury West.

See also
 List of Auckland railway stations

References

Defunct railway stations in New Zealand
Rail transport in Auckland
Railway stations opened in 1926
Railway stations closed in 1983